Phyllonorycter hikosana is a moth of the family Gracillariidae. It is known from Kyūshū island of Japan.

This species is represented by the aestival (summer) and autumnal forms, which are distinctive in colour.

The larvae feed on Carpinus tschonoskii. They mine the leaves of their host plant. The mine has the form of a ptychonomous blotch mine on the underside of the leaf.

References

hikosana
Moths of Japan

Leaf miners
Moths described in 1963
Taxa named by Tosio Kumata